Crawley Town Football Club is an English association football club based in the town of Crawley, West Sussex. Founded in 1896 as Crawley F.C., the team played in junior leagues until 1951 when they were admitted to the Sussex County League as part of its attempted expansion. In their second season, they finished bottom of that league's First Division with only 4 points from 26 matches, but regulations prevented any team being relegated until the division reached its full complement of 16 teams. After another last-place finish two seasons later, they were relegated, but a runners-up spot in the Second Division in 1955–56 preceded a move into the Metropolitan & District League.

In 1958, under its new name of Crawley Town, the club entered the FA Cup for the first time; its team lost in the preliminary round at home to Horsham. It adopted professional status four years later, and entered the Southern League in 1963–64. Crawley gained promotion to that league's Premier Division for the 1969–70 season, but dropped straight back to Division One. When the league expanded to create two regional second-tier divisions, Crawley were placed in the southern division. They remained in the southern half when the creation of the Alliance Premier League as the top non-league division forced another restructure of the Southern League, this time with parallel Midland and Southern Divisions. Crawley's lowly finish in 1981–82 meant they failed to benefit from yet another reorganisation, whereby the top ten teams in each regional division formed a new Premier Division, but two years later they were promoted as runners-up.

They remained at that level for the next twenty years, until they won their first Southern League title in 2003–04 and consequent promotion to the new Conference National. Despite a variety of points deductions, including ten points in 2006–07 for entering administration and six the following season for financial irregularities, and a transfer embargo, they held on to their Conference status. In 2010–11, they not only progressed to the fifth round of the FA Cup, coming "within inches" of drawing with Manchester United at Old Trafford via Richard Brodie's header against the crossbar, they were not distracted from the league campaign; a 30-match unbeaten run and a Conference record 105 points earned them the 2010–11 title and promotion to the Football League. As well as reaching the FA Cup fifth round again, they came third in their first season in League Two, so went up to League One, where they remained for three seasons before returning to the fourth tier.

The table details the team's achievements and the top goalscorer in senior first-team competitions from their first season in the Sussex County League in 1951–52 to the end of the most recently completed season.

Key

Key to league record:
P – Played
W – Games won
D – Games drawn
L – Games lost
F – Goals for
A – Goals against
Pts – Points
Pos – Final position

Key to divisions:
Sussex – Sussex County League
Sussex 1 – Sussex County League First Division
Sussex 2 – Sussex County League Second Division
Met & D – Metropolitan & District League
Met – Metropolitan League
South P – Southern League Premier Division
South S – Southern League Southern Section
South 1 – Southern League First Division
South 1S – Southern League First Division Southern Section
Conf – Conference National
League One – Football League One
League Two – Football League Two, EFL League Two

Key to rounds:
Group – Group stage
Prelim – Preliminary round
QR1 – First qualifying round
QR2 – Second qualifying round, etc.
R1 – First round
R2 – Second round, etc.
QF – Quarter-final

F – Final
(S) – Southern section of regionalised stage

Seasons

Notes

References

External links
Crawley Town F.C. official website

Seasons
 
Crawley Town